Arun Subramanian (born 1979) is an American lawyer from New York who is a designate to serve as a United States district judge of the United States District Court for the Southern District of New York.

Early life and education 

Subramanian was born in Pittsburgh to immigrants from India, where his father was a control systems engineer and his mother was a bookkeeper. He earned a Bachelor of Arts from Case Western Reserve University in 2001 and a Juris Doctor from Columbia Law School in 2004.

Career 

From 2004 to 2005, Subramanian served as a law clerk to Judge Dennis Jacobs of the United States Court of Appeals for the Second Circuit. From 2005 to 2006, he was a law clerk for Judge Gerard E. Lynch of the United States District Court for the Southern District of New York and from 2006 to 2007, he was a law clerk for Justice Ruth Bader Ginsburg of the Supreme Court of the United States. Since 2007, he has been a partner at Susman Godfrey LLP in New York City. Subramanian chairs the firm’s pro bono practice and focuses on consumer protection, antitrust law, bankruptcy law, commercial class actions, and contract and tort litigation.

Notable cases 

 In 2010, whistleblower David Kester alleged that Novartis AG, a European pharmaceutical company, offered illegal kickbacks in an effort to increase sales of its transplant drug Myfortic. In November 2015, Novartis AG agreed to settle for $390 million. Subramanian was part of the legal team that represented David Kester in the case.

 Subramanian served as counsel to a whistleblower and numerous political subdivisions in California in a False Claims Act lawsuit against wireless carriers AT&T, Sprint, Verizon, and T-Mobile. The lawsuit, filed in 2012, charged that Verizon and AT&T failed to optimize rate plans to the lowest cost option as pledged in their contracts with governments. Verizon Wireless and AT&T Mobility agreed to pay a combined $116 million to settle the lawsuit alleging the wireless carriers overcharged hundreds of California cities, schools and other government entities.

 In February 2017, whistleblowers filed a complaint under the qui tam provisions of the False Claims Act (FCA), as well as other state false claims laws against Apria Healthcare Group, Inc. and its affiliate, Apria Healthcare LLC, alleging that the medical device company violated the FCA and state false claims laws. In the lawsuit, the whistleblowers alleged that Apria charged federal health programs, including Medicare and Medicaid, for rentals of non-invasive medical ventilators that were not being used by patients, or that were being used in a therapy mode that did not qualify for the billing codes used. In December 2020, Apria agreed to pay $40.5 million to resolve a lawsuit. Benjamin Martinez Jr., Connie Morgan, and Chris Negrete were represented by Arun Subramanian, Steven M. Shepard, Bill Carmody, Mark Hatch-Miller, and Russell Rennie in the case.

Nomination to district court 

Subramanian was recommended to President Joe Biden by Senator Chuck Schumer. On September 2, 2022, President Biden announced his intent to nominate Subramanian to serve as a United States district judge of the United States District Court for the Southern District of New York. On September 6, 2022, his nomination was sent to the Senate. President Biden nominated Subramanian to the seat vacated by Judge Alison Nathan, who was elevated to the United States Court of Appeals for the Second Circuit on March 31, 2022. On December 13, 2022, a hearing on his nomination was held before the Senate Judiciary Committee. On January 3, 2023, his nomination was returned to the President under Rule XXXI, Paragraph 6 of the United States Senate. He was renominated on January 23, 2023. On February 9, 2023, his nomination was reported out of committee by a 16–5 vote. On March 7, 2023, the Senate invoked cloture on his nomination by a 58–37 vote. Later that day, his nomination was confirmed by a 59–37 vote. He is awaiting his judicial commission. Once commissioned, he will be the first South Asian judge to serve on the United States District Court for the Southern District of New York.

See also 
 List of law clerks of the Supreme Court of the United States (Seat 6)

References

External links 

1979 births
Living people
21st-century American judges
21st-century American lawyers
American jurists of Indian descent
Case Western Reserve University alumni
Columbia Law School alumni
Judges of the United States District Court for the Southern District of New York
Law clerks of the Supreme Court of the United States
Lawyers from Pittsburgh
New York (state) lawyers
United States district court judges appointed by Joe Biden